Rasnica is a village in the municipality of Pirot, Serbia. According to the 2002 census, the village has a population of 391 people.

References

Posle nestanka sela (ne zna se pravi razlog) Sredorek ljudi su pobegli dalje od Carigradskog Puta(Via Militaris) i dalje od turaka koji su se naseljavali uglavnom blize putu i u ravnici. Jedna skupina se naselila pored Rasnicke Reke (danasnje Seliste), a druga blizu izvora Ropatske Reke(Ropatovo). Kada su prilike dozvolile porodice su pocele da se spustaju blize gradu(prvo selo iz Selista a posle i iz Ropatova) i poceli da se naseljavaju pored izvora i u blizini vec postojece crkve i tom novom selu su dali ime Rasnica. Seliste i Ropatovo su bila naselja sa kucama udaljenim jednih od drugih dok je Rasnica selo s kucama blizu i zgusnutim a jedinstveno je po tome sto kroz selo prolazi kruzni put a kuce su sa obe strane. U sredinu sela se nalazi fudbalsko igraliste (Selsce Gradine) na kome igra seoski klub “Sloboda”.

U selu je pored male napravljena nova crkva(poceta 1906 a zavrsena 1908) sa crkvenim domom upravom i skolom. Osnovna skola na dva nivoa je napravljena 1948–49. i tu su skolu od 5. do 8. razreda pohadjala deca iz 6 susednih sela.  Crkvena i opstinska evidencija(Mesna Zajednica) su cuvane u selu kao sto su i pruzane osnovne  usluge. U selu je postojala biblioteka, prodavnica i mlekara .Struja je prikljucena 1958. godine,voda 1972. ,put asfaltiran 1974. a telefon prikljucen 1982.

Kroz selo protice Rasnicka Reka na kojoj je radilo 14 vodenica a selo je naseljavalo 25 familija( u okviru jedne familije postoji vise porodica koje cesto ne dele isto prezime). Stanovnici se uglavnom bave poljoprivredom, stocarstvom i zanatstvom a najcesce kombinacijom ovih zanimanja

Populated places in Pirot District